Manley is the given name of:

 M. Caldwell Butler (1925–2014), U.S. Representative from Virginia
 Manley Sonny Carter (1947-1991), American physician, professional soccer player, United States Navy officer, and NASA astronaut
 Manley Dixon (1760?-1837), British admiral
 Manley Justin Edwards (1892-1962), Canadian barrister, teacher and politician
 Manley Ottmer Hudson (1886-1960), American lawyer and judge at the Permanent Court of International Justice
 Manley Angell James (1896-1975), British general and recipient of the Victoria Cross
 Manley Kemp (1861–1951), British schoolmaster and cricketer
 Manley Power (1773-1826), British lieutenant general and Lieutenant Governor of Malta
 Laurence Eliot Power, British admiral and grandson of the above
 Manley Laurence Power (1904-1981), British admiral and son of the above